is a brand of cup instant ramen developed in 1971 and manufactured by a Japanese food company Nissin Foods. Single servings of the product are packaged in foam, plastic, or paper cups and are prepared by adding boiling water.

The brand name Cup Noodle is also a registered trademark of Nissin Foods. In some countries, such as Japan, this singular form Cup Noodle is used. The product has inspired various competing products, such as Maruchan's Instant Lunch.

History 
Instant noodles were invented in 1958 by Momofuku Ando, the Taiwanese-born founder of the Japanese food company Nissin. He used Chicken Ramen as the first instant ramen noodles.

In 1970, Nissin formed the subsidiary Nissin Foods (USA) Co. Inc., to sell instant noodles in the United States and opened a factory in Lancaster, Pennsylvania in 1973.  Nissin recognized that the bowls traditionally used to package instant noodles in Asia were not common in the US, so the paper cup was designed by Ron R. Matteson. In 1971, Nissin introduced instant ramen packaged in a foam cup. The three original Cup O' Noodles flavors in the US were beef, chicken and shrimp; pork flavor was added in 1976. All flavors originally contained pieces of dehydrated egg which was removed in the early 1980s. In 1978, Nissin Foods offered more new varieties of Top Ramen and Cup O' Noodles. Japan Airlines has offered Cup Noodle with the exclusive de Sky flavor on board since 1992, and since 2021 the product has been available in the airline's online store. The product was known as Cup O' Noodles in the United States until 1993. In 1998, Cup Noodles Hot Sauce Varieties were  introduced (Beef, Chicken, Pork and Shrimp).

Today 

Today, instant noodles in Japan are often sold in foam bowls, sometimes with plastic utensils. Foam bowls are inexpensive, disposable, light, and easy to hold, since they insulate heat well. Different flavors are available in other parts of the world, such as tom yum in Thailand, curry in Japan, crab in Hong Kong, and churrasco in Brazil.

In 2016 the US version was changed, reducing sodium and removing MSG and artificial flavors.

In popular culture 
From 1996 to 2006, a  Nissin Cup Noodle sign was installed in Times Square, New York City. It was located prominently near the top of the One Times Square building, the location of the Times Square Ball drop on New Year's Eve. The sign was the most recent example in a tradition of steaming signs in Times Square, which started with an A&P 8 O'Clock Coffee cup in 1933.

Cup Noodles are often seen in the 2012 video game Binary Domain, which is set in a futuristic version of Tokyo. It is commonly seen in billboards and advertisements throughout the city, and is even seen being eaten by some characters. Cup Noodles were also prominently featured as product placement in the 2016 video game Final Fantasy XV. This partnership also resulted in a crossover TV ad in Japan. Cup Noodles have also been noted in the upcoming video game Star Citizen as a fictional product placement under the manufacture of a corporation known as "Big Benny's".

The popularity of Cup Noodles has also resulted in the creation of a Cup Noodle Museum. The museum features displays on cup noodles and their founder, Momofuku Ando. The museum is located in Yokohama, Japan.

In 2018, Manpuku was broadcast in Japan. The television drama series documented Momofuku Ando and his wife Masako's lives, including the invention of instant noodles and cup noodles. It is the 99th Asadora series, it premiered on NHK on October 1, 2018, and concluded on March 30, 2019.

Flavors 
Flavors include Beef, Chicken, Shrimp, Mushroom Chicken, Laksa, Chilli Crab, Black Pepper Crab, Tom Yam Seafood, Spicy Seafood, Seafood Curry, Kyushu White, Seafood, Thai Basil Chicken, Cream Of Chicken, Sriracha Chicken, Spicy Lime Shrimp, Hot and Spicy Shrimp, Spicy Chicken, Tonkotsu, Pork, Oriental Flavor, Yakitori Chicken and Roasted Sesame Soup.

See also 

 Frozen noodles
 List of instant noodle brands
 Maruchan
 Pot Noodle
 Sapporo Ichiban
 Top Ramen
 Shin Ramyun

References

External links 

 Cup Noodles official website (U.S)
  
 Science Channel's The Making Series: #47 Making of Cup Noodles (video in Japanese)
 Nissin documentary

Ramen
Instant noodle brands
Products introduced in 1971